The target strength or acoustic size is a measure of the area of a sonar target.  This is usually quantified as a number of decibels.  For fish such as salmon, the target size varies with the length of the fish and a 5 cm fish could have a target strength of about -50 dB.

Target strength (TS) is equal to 10 log10(σbs/(1 m2)) dB, where σbs is the differential backscattering cross section. Backscattering cross section is 4πσbs.

References

Further reading
 "Introduction to the use of sonar systems for estimating fish biomass, FAO Fisheries Technical Paper No. 191, Revision 1, FAO 1982"
 Fisheries Acoustics Simmonds, E John and MacLennan, David N (2005)  Blackwell Publishing. 
 C. S. Clay & H. Medwin, Acoustical Oceanography (Wiley, New York, 1977)

target strength formula:

e.g. for a sphere with radius :

TS m dB

Acoustics
Oceanography
Fisheries science
Sonar